In the run-up to the 2021 Senedd election, various organisations carried out opinion polling to gauge voting intentions. Results of such polls are displayed in this list. Most of the pollsters listed are members of the British Polling Council (BPC) and abide by its disclosure rules.

The date range for these opinion polls was from the 2016 National Assembly for Wales election, held on 5 May 2016, to 6 May 2021 when the election for the newly named Senedd took place and was the first Welsh election which included 16 and 17-year-olds in the electoral franchise. After January 2020 most opinion polls also included this data set to reflect the enfranchisement in the next election.

Constituency vote
The opinion polls below are gauge voting intentions for the 40 single member constituency seats elected through the plurality voting system.

Graphical summary
The chart below depicts constituency vote opinion polls conducted for the Senedd election.

Poll results

Regional vote 
The opinion polls below are gauge voting intentions for the 20 regional list seats elected through the additional member system.

Graphical summary 
The chart below depicts regional vote opinion polls conducted for the next Senedd election.

Poll results

Leadership polling
At various dates in the run up to the 2021 Senedd election, various organisations carried out opinion polling to gauge the opinions that voters hold towards political leaders. Results of these polls are displayed in this article. The polling companies listed are members of the British Polling Council (BPC) and abide by its disclosure rules.

The date range for these opinion polls is from 2019 to 2021, with the exception of Welsh party leaders where the entire polling history is shown.

Most approval polling in Wales is carried out by YouGov/Cardiff University. A single score is then given to each figure, based on where the most common answer for a leader lies, with 0 representing Strongly Dislike and 10 representing Strongly Like.

Welsh party leaders

Mark Drakeford 
The following polls asked about voters' opinions on Mark Drakeford, leader of Welsh Labour and First Minister of Wales.

Paul Davies 
The following polls asked about voters' opinions on Paul Davies, the former leader of the Welsh Conservatives and the former Leader of the Opposition in Wales. He resigned as Leader of the Welsh Conservatives and Leader of the Opposition on 23 January 2021, after it was exposed that he was involved in an incident which possibly broke Welsh COVID-19 regulations in December 2020. Andrew RT Davies became the new leader of the Welsh Conservatives and Leader of the Opposition in Wales on 24 January 2021.

Adam Price 
The following polls asked about voters' opinions on Adam Price, leader of Plaid Cymru.

Jane Dodds 
The following polls asked about voters' opinions on Jane Dodds, the leader of the Welsh Liberal Democrats.

Mark Reckless 
The following polls asked about voters' opinions on Mark Reckless, leader of the Brexit Party.

Neil Hamilton 
The following polls asked about voters' opinions on Neil Hamilton, leader of UKIP.

UK party leaders

Boris Johnson 
The following polls asked about voters' opinions on Boris Johnson, leader of the Conservative Party and prime minister of the United Kingdom.

Keir Starmer 
The following polls asked about voters' opinions on Keir Starmer, the leader of the Labour Party and Leader of the Opposition.

Ed Davey 
The following polls asked about voters' opinions on Ed Davey, the leader of the Liberal Democrats.

Nigel Farage 
The following polls asked about voters' opinions on Nigel Farage, the leader of the Brexit Party.

Siân Berry 
The following polls asked about voters' opinions on Siân Berry, co-leader of the Green Party.

Jonathan Bartley 
The following polls asked about voters' opinions on Jonathan Bartley, co-leader of the Green Party.

Approval ratings for former party leaders

Jeremy Corbyn 
The following polls asked about voters' opinions on Jeremy Corbyn, the former leader of the Labour Party.

Jo Swinson 
The following polls asked about voters' opinions on Jo Swinson, the former leader of the Liberal Democrats.

Topical polling

Coronavirus handling 

The following polls have asked people how well they think key figures have handled the coronavirus pandemic: very well, fairly well, fairly badly, very badly, or don't know. They are then provided with a Total Well or Total Badly figure.

Average popularity 
The following averages are taken from the above breakdown of individual figures' popularity. Note for some figures polling exists prior to 2018 which is not shown here. Some figures may only have a small number of surveys.

Seat projections 
Professor Roger Scully of Cardiff University's Wales Governance Centre provides seat projections based on individual opinion polls at regular intervals on his blog, known as Elections in Wales.

See also 
Opinion polling for the next United Kingdom general election in Wales
Opinion polling for the 2021 Scottish Parliament election
Opinion polling for the 2022 Northern Ireland Assembly election
Opinion polling for the 2016 National Assembly for Wales election

Notes

References

External links 
 Roger Scully's Elections in Wales – Etholiadau yng Nghymru
 Britain Elects Senedd voting intention archive (2015–present)
 Results of the 2016 National Assembly for Wales election
 Elections in Wales Blog at Cardiff University
 YouGov political figures popularity ratings

Opinion polling in Wales
2021
Elections in Wales
Politics of Wales
Opinion polling for United Kingdom votes in the 2020s